WCAT may refer to:

Radio stations
 WCAT (AM), a defunct radio station at 1390 AM formerly located in Burlington, Vermont
 WCAT-FM, a radio station at 102.3 FM located in Carlisle, Pennsylvania
 WWKL (FM), which was previously known as WCAT-FM and was simulcast on the current WCAT-FM
 WQVD, a radio station (700 AM) licensed to Orange-Athol, Massachusetts, United States, which used the call sign WCAT from 1956 to 1987 and from 1988 until 2005
 WKMY (FM), a radio station (99.9 FM) licensed to Athol, Massachusetts, United States, which used the call sign WCAT-FM from 1989 until 2002
 KTEQ-FM, a college FM radio station located in Rapid City, South Dakota, which is the successor to an AM station known as WCAT that operated from 1922 to 1952
 WXXL, a radio station (106.7 FM) licensed to Tavares, Florida, United States, which used the call sign WCAT-FM from 1987 until 1988

Other uses
 Wakefield City Academies Trust